Puchong-Damansara Highway (LDP). The location is very strategic to quick access to Putrajaya, Cyberjaya, Serdang, Kuala Lumpur International Airport, Subang Jaya, Kajang, Shah Alam, Sunway, Damansara and Kuala Lumpur  city center. Please visit https://web.archive.org/web/20110723033515/http://www.bukitpuchong.net/ to know more about Bandar Bukit Puchong.

Populated places in Selangor